Curling at the 2007 Winter Universiade took place from January 18 to 26 at the Pinerolo Palaghiaccio in Pinerolo, Italy.

Men

Teams

Round-robin standings

Round-robin results

Draw 1

Draw 2

Draw 3

Draw 4

Draw 5

Draw 6

Draw 7

Draw 8

Draw 9

Playoffs

Semifinals

Bronze Medal Game

Gold Medal Game

Women

Teams

Round-robin standings

Round-robin results

Draw 1

Draw 2

Draw 3

Draw 4

Draw 5

Draw 6

Draw 7

Draw 8

Draw 9

Tiebreakers

Round 1

Round 2

Playoffs

Semifinals

Bronze Medal Game

Gold Medal Game

External links

Curling
Winter Universiade
2007
International curling competitions hosted by Italy